APBL98 (short for Apoptygma Berzerk Live 1998) is Apoptygma Berzerk's first live album containing live recordings from concerts all across Europe. It was mainly recorded with DAT-tape recorders borrowed from Stephan's father, Jan Groth and has been described by Stephan as a "commercial bootleg album" due to its quality.

Track listing
All tracks by Stephan Groth. Except track 18.

Media disc
The album also contained an interactive CD-ROM disc that could be played on either a PC or a Macintosh, that contained an extensive documentary of the tour filmed with a handheld camera, an interview about the Mourn track, a music video for Deep Red, a sort of "live" music video for Enjoy the Silence and an interactive menu.

Personnel 

Stephan Groth (Grothesk) – vocals, programming, guitars and everything
Geir Bratland – keyboard, backing vocals
Anders Odden – guitar

Apoptygma Berzerk albums
1999 live albums